The Ronnie Wood Band toured England and Ireland during 2001 and 2002. The band featured Ronnie Wood, Slash, Andrea Corr, Jesse Wood, Martin Wright, Tramper Price, Mark Wells, Leah Wood, and Frankie Gavin. A concert from the tour is available on DVD as Far East Man, a song co-written by Ronnie Wood and George Harrison.

External links
 http://www.ronniewood.com

British rock music groups